Eupanacra busiris, the green rippled hawkmoth, is a moth of the family Sphingidae.

Distribution 
It is known from Malaysia (Peninsular, Sarawak), Indonesia (Sumatra, Java, Kalimantan, Sulawesi), Nepal, north-eastern India, the Andaman Islands, Myanmar, Thailand, southern China, Vietnam and the Philippines. Probably also in Sri Lanka.

Description 
The wingspan is 68–82 mm. Adults of ssp. busiris have a vivid green colour on the upperside of the head and thorax and a characteristic green area on the forewing comprising a broad costal band with a lobe extending towards the hind margin. In the other subspecies the colouration is duller. The distal margin of the forewing is deeply sinuate. The hindwing is narrow and the costal margin is clearly dilated near the base. The upperside of the head and thorax is green. The forewing upperside has a green space between the antemedian and postmedian lines, contrasting with the rest of the wing.

Biology 
Adults are on wing from late March to late August in Hong Kong. They fly at dusk and are attracted to the flowers of Duranta erecta.

The larvae have been recorded on Lasia species and Pothos scandens in India.

Subspecies
Eupanacra busiris busiris (Malaysia (Peninsular, Sarawak), Indonesia (Sumatra, Java, Kalimantan), Nepal, north-eastern India, Myanmar, Thailand, southern China and Vietnam)
Eupanacra busiris atima (Rothschild & Jordan, 1915) (India)
Eupanacra busiris marina (Rothschild & Jordan, 1915) (Andaman Islands)
Eupanacra busiris myosotis Cadiou & Holloway, 1989 (Sulawesi)
Eupanacra busiris schuetzi Hogenes & Treadaway, 1996 (the Philippines)

References

Eupanacra
Moths described in 1856